Ricardo Ribeiro Fernandes (born 21 April 1978) is a Portuguese former footballer who played as an attacking midfielder.

He amassed Primeira Liga totals of 72 matches and eight goals during four seasons, representing in the competition Gil Vicente, Sporting, Porto and Académica. He also competed professionally in Cyprus, Ukraine, Israel and Greece, notably spending several years in the Cypriot First Division with five clubs and winning the national championship with APOEL in 2007.

Club career

Sporting / Porto
Fernandes was born in Moreira de Cónegos, Guimarães. After a number of impressive performances for Gil Vicente FC, with whom he made his Primeira Liga debuts in the 2001–02 campaign, he returned to Sporting CP who owned the player's rights; at the time, he was hailed as one of the country's brightest young prospects.

After only one season, Fernandes was signed by José Mourinho for his FC Porto side, which won the 2003–04 edition of the UEFA Champions League. He appeared sparingly for the club during his spell due to injury, playing only 19 games in all competitions as he was understudy to Portuguese international Deco, and left after another sole campaign.

APOEL
After a spell with Académica de Coimbra, Fernandes was signed on a lucrative three-year deal to APOEL FC in Cyprus. In his first year, he became an instant crowd favorite with his accurate set pieces and creative passing, scoring nine times with a remarkable number of assists and also helping his team to the domestic cup.

In his second season, Fernandes netted five league goals as APOEL were crowned national champions.

Later years
Fernandes returned to Cyprus on 17 June 2009, signing a three-year contract with Anorthosis Famagusta FC. On 30 December, 19 days after being released, he joined another team in that country, AEL Limassol.

On 4 June 2010, 32-year-old Fernandes signed a contract with Israel's Hapoel Be'er Sheva AFC, reuniting with former AEL coach Nir Klinger. In January 2011, however, he returned to former Ukrainian club FC Metalurh Donetsk.

Club statistics

Honours
Freamunde
Segunda Divisão B: 1998–99
Terceira Divisão: 1997–98

Santa Clara
Segunda Liga: 2000–01

Sporting
Supertaça Cândido de Oliveira: 2002

Porto
Primeira Liga: 2003–04
Supertaça Cândido de Oliveira: 2003
UEFA Champions League: 2003–04
Taça de Portugal: Runner-up 2003–04

APOEL
Cypriot First Division: 2006–07
Cypriot Cup: 2005–06

References

External links

Football-Lineups profile
 
 

1978 births
Living people
Portuguese footballers
Association football midfielders
Primeira Liga players
Liga Portugal 2 players
Segunda Divisão players
C.D. Aves players
Moreirense F.C. players
S.C. Freamunde players
Sporting CP footballers
C.D. Santa Clara players
Gil Vicente F.C. players
Sporting CP B players
FC Porto players
Associação Académica de Coimbra – O.A.F. players
C.D. Trofense players
F.C. Felgueiras 1932 players
Cypriot First Division players
APOEL FC players
Anorthosis Famagusta F.C. players
AEL Limassol players
Doxa Katokopias FC players
AC Omonia players
Ukrainian Premier League players
FC Metalurh Donetsk players
Israeli Premier League players
Hapoel Be'er Sheva F.C. players
Super League Greece players
Panetolikos F.C. players
Portuguese expatriate footballers
Expatriate footballers in Cyprus
Expatriate footballers in Ukraine
Expatriate footballers in Israel
Expatriate footballers in Greece
Portuguese expatriate sportspeople in Cyprus
Portuguese expatriate sportspeople in Ukraine
Portuguese expatriate sportspeople in Israel
Portuguese expatriate sportspeople in Greece
Sportspeople from Guimarães